The prairie chub (Macrhybopsis australis) is a freshwater ray-finned fish in the family Cyprinidae, the carps and minnows. It occurs in the upper Red River drainage in Oklahoma and Texas. Its preferred habitat is sand and gravel runs of creeks and small to large rivers.

References

Macrhybopsis
Freshwater fish of the United States
Fish described in 1929